is a Japanese songwriter, actress, novelist and essayist. With her husband, Ryudo Uzaki, she has written many songs for other singers, with Aki as lyricist and Uzaki as composer. They are especially famous for a series of hit songs of Momoe Yamaguchi's.

She has acted in several films, and she won the award for best supporting actress at the 5th Hochi Film Award for Shiki Natsuko.
She was a model under an exclusive contract with Kanebo Cosmetics for many years.

Career 
In 1969, Aki wrote Blue Lonesome Dream which is a debut song of the Group Sounds band Julie and The baron for the first time. Her husband, Ryudo Uzaki composed it. Then they wrote many hit songs.

In 1980, she made her debut as an actress.

Discography

(as lyricist)

Manjushaka
Playback Part Two
"I MY MIE" (MIE)

Filmography
 Shiki Natsuko (1980)
 The Family Game (1983)
 Keshin (1986)
 A Homansu (1986)
 Devilman (2004)

External links
 Official Website

References

1945 births
Living people
Japanese actresses
People from Nagano Prefecture
Japanese songwriters
20th-century Japanese novelists
Japanese essayists
20th-century essayists
Recipients of the Medal with Purple Ribbon